The Council of the University of Cambridge is its principal executive and policy making body, having responsibility for the administration of the University, for the planning of its work, and for the management of its resources. Since the Regent House is the governing body of the University, however, the Council must report and be accountable to the Regents through a variety of checks and balances. It has the right of reporting to the University, and is obliged to advise the Regent House on matters of general concern to the University. It does both of these by causing notices to be published by authority in the Cambridge University Reporter, the official journal of the University.

The University is an exempt charity under as per the Charities Act 2011, regulated by the Office for Students. Under charity law the trustees are the members of the University Council.

Membership
Membership of the Council consists of the Chancellor and Vice-Chancellor of the University (the office of Chancellor, which is held for life, is mainly ceremonial, while the Vice-Chancellor is de facto the principal academic and administrative officer), nineteen elected members, and four appointed members, divided into classes as follows:

Current constitution

* The Chancellor does not normally attend meetings

† Professor Richard Penty is also the current Master of Sidney Sussex

‡ Mark Lewisohn also acts as the Deputy Chair of Council

External Members
From January 2005, the membership of the Council included two external members.  The Regent House voted for an increase from two to four in the number of external members in March 2008, and this was approved by Her Majesty the Queen in July 2008.

Meetings

The Council normally holds meetings once per month, except for August, in the Council Room in The Old Schools. During the COVID-19 pandemic meetings have been held via Zoom.

References

External links
 The Council

Council